Prasinococcus is a genus of green algae in the family Prasinococcaceae.

Discovery
Prasinococcus capsulatus, the only currently known member of this genus, was discovered in the West Pacific Ocean during a cruise by the research vessel Sohgen-maru in November–December 1990.

Morphology
Prasinococcus have a firm cell wall lacking scales and also lack flagella. The mitochondrial lobe and chloroplast outer membrane both protrude into the pyrenoid matrix which is considered characteristic of the genus. The cell wall has a protruding circular collar which is surrounded by holes which penetrate the cell wall. Its method of asexual reproduction is also considered characteristic - after cell division one daughter cell remains within the original cell wall while the other is extruded.

Pigment composition
The pigments of Prasinococcus include chlorophylls a and b, prasinoxanthin, Mg 2, 4-diviriylphaeoporphyrin a5 monomethyl ester (Mg 2, 4-D) and 5, 6-epoxy-3, 3′-dihydroxy-5, 6, 7′, 8′-tetrahydro-β-ε-caroten-11′ and 19-olide (uriolide).

References

External links

Chlorophyta genera
Palmophyllophyceae
Monotypic algae genera